496th may refer to:

496th Air Base Squadron, United States Air Force unit, stationed at Morón Air Base, Spain
496th Bombardment Squadron, inactive United States Air Force unit
496th Tactical Fighter Squadron, inactive United States Air Force unit

See also
496 (number)
496, the year 496 (CDXCVI) of the Julian calendar
496 BC